Barbara Rossi (born 18 May 1961) is a former professional tennis player from Italy.

Biography

Professional career
Rossi, who comes from Milan, represented Italy in nine Federation Cup ties. Competing on the WTA Tour in the early 1980s, her best result was a quarter-final appearance at the Japan Open in 1981. She made the third round of the 1981 French Open and had a win over Betty Stöve at the 1982 US Open.

Career after tennis
Since retiring as a player she has worked as a Milan-based tennis coach. Currently she runs the local Quanta Tennis Academy. She is also a tennis commentator for television network Eurosport.

References

External links
 
 
 

1961 births
Living people
Italian female tennis players
Tennis players from Milan